, also known as Ghosts at School, is a Japanese series of children's novels written by . It was published by Kodansha, starting in 1990. The series is a collection of popular school ghost stories in Japan, rewritten specifically for a young demographic. A four-part film series based on the books was produced from 1995 to 1999. Additionally, it was adapted into a television series in 1994 and an anime produced by Studio Pierrot in 2000. A video game was also produced.

The books were received positively in Japan upon release. The first film received a nomination for Best Screenplay at the 19th Japanese Academy Awards. Sources conflict as to whether the anime's original run was successful or not, though there is evidence of a relatively successful run. Nevertheless, it received notoriety in the succeeding years with its official English dub, which mostly replaced the original script for the series with pop culture references and dark humor.

Synopsis
Ghost Stories follows Satsuki Miyanoshita, who moves with her family to the hometown of her deceased mother. On her first day of school, Satsuki, her brother Keiichirou (a first-grader), Hajime Aoyama (their neighbor), Momoko Koigakubo (an older schoolmate), and Leo Kakinoki (a classmate and friend of Hajime's with a penchant for the paranormal) visit the abandoned school building adjacent the current school complex and discover that the building is haunted.

It is soon after revealed that Satsuki's mother was responsible for sealing several ghosts who haunted not only the school but also the town, which are now inadvertently being released due to urbanization taking place in the surrounding area. Satsuki's mother left behind a book detailing how to exorcise the ghosts once and for all. In her first confrontation, Satsuki faces a demon called Amanojaku, but in the process, he is sealed within Satsuki's pet cat, Kaya. Although Amanojaku does not want to help Satsuki at first, the danger soon threatens to envelop the town and it is left up to Satsuki, her friends, and Amanojaku to stop the ghosts. With Amanojaku's help, the friends finally are able to exorcise the ghosts.

Characters

Satsuki moves to the hometown of her deceased mother with her father and her little brother Keiichiro, where she finds that her mother confronted several evil entities that haunted the town, which included Amanojaku, and wrote all her supernatural experiences in a diary, which is entitled "The Ghost Journal". Satsuki is very strong, brave and determined within, but sometimes a bit moody, mostly because of Hajime's reckless behavior.

Momoko is a sixth-grader and Satsuki's best friend. She seems to fear nothing, even in dangerous situations, and is very brave when it comes to helping Satsuki and the gang confront the ghosts. She also has a psychic connection with Satsuki's mother. In the ADV English dub, she is a right-wing born again Evangelical Christian from a posh family, and almost every sentence she utters contains a thinly-veiled reference to Christianity or the religious right. She mentions that she was a heavy drug user and a sex addict prior to becoming a Christian.

Hajime is Satsuki's neighbor. He is strong and courageous but has cowardly tendencies. Despite this, he is one of the most reliable of Satsuki's friends. In the ADV English dub, Hajime is a stereotypical anime protagonist with a slightly horny streak.

Leo is Hajime's friend and has a big obsession with paranormal themes, and proclaims himself as a respected paranormal researcher. However, whenever Leo finds a clue pertaining to the existence of supernatural entities, it seems that it turns against him. Like Hajime, he tries to be brave, but most of the time shows cowardice. In the English dub by ADV, he is portrayed as a dorky teenager from a Jewish family.

Keiichiro is Satsuki's younger brother. He is easily frightened, fooled, manipulated, and often cries, but on rare occasions shows courage in defeating the ghosts. Because of his weaknesses, he often creates situations that the other characters have to solve. He creates a special friendship with the ghost Amanojaku. In the ADV English dub, his incompetence is elevated to that of being mentally challenged. He is often referred to as having dyslexia and is seen applying to the Special Olympics. He will often respond with a non sequitur and in times of stress, his speech will turn into a childish babble. He behaves oddly and randomly bursts into laughter, tears, or squeals.

Amanojaku is a powerful entity that, long ago, was sealed by Satsuki's mother in a tree in the mountains, but was finally released from his magic prison when that tree was cut down during urbanization. However, he did not have his freedom long, as Satsuki accidentally sealed him in the body of her pet cat, Kaya. At first, Amanojaku is hostile toward the kids and takes great pleasure in seeing them in trouble, but throughout the series, he develops an attachment to them (especially Satsuki and Keiichiro) and starts helping them in giving clues and sometimes gives direct help to the kids. He is the typical tsundere anime character. In the ADV English dub, he retains his antagonism towards the kids and will often break the fourth wall complaining about the poor animation, lazy writing or not being paid enough.

Mr. Sakata is the teacher of the class where Satsuki, Hajime, and Leo attend. Despite not believing in ghosts, he suffers as a victim of many supernatural incidents. Mr. Sakata is often possessed, cursed, and kidnapped by ghosts. A running gag in the ADV  dub has him exclaiming his hatred for an unseen teacher named Ms. Hadley.

Reiichirou is Satsuki's father. He has no clue about his daughter's supernatural duties and does not believe in ghosts. In the ADV English dub, he is a largely absent and inattentive father. It is implied that he is a cross-dresser.

Kayako is Satsuki's and Keiichiro's deceased mother. Through her diary, it is revealed that she was an avid exorcist during her childhood. She possesses Momoko two times throughout the series to aid Satsuki against the Piano Ghost and Kutabe, and once helped Satsuki and the others to escape from a powerful haunting called Anamnaneki. Her maiden name was Kamiyama. It was revealed that she is haunting The Ghost Journal that she made for Satsuki (this was proven when The Ghost Journal content disappeared after Satsuki exorcised all ghosts that she dealt with during her childhood) and assisting her through the diary or possessing Momoko. In the dub, she is either bisexual or lesbian.

Media

ADV Films dub
Aniplex, who owned the series' Western distribution rights, approached ADV Films to produce an English dub. Aniplex gave the ADV Films staff very few constraints when writing the new version, the only rules were "don't change the character names (including the ghosts); don't change the way the ghosts are slain (a reference to Japanese folklore) and, finally, don't change the core meaning of each episode".

The English dub deviates significantly from the original script. While preserving the basic plot structure and storyline the new script revolved around topical pop-culture references, politically incorrect gags, and fourth wall breaking jokes about the original show's low animation quality, anime cliches, and poor lip-sync.

The English script was written by Steven Foster and Lucan Duran and allowed for ad-lib by the English voice actors. According to Foster, whoever showed up to the recording studio first for any given episode could improvise anything they wanted, those that came later had to build upon the tone and jokes established earlier.

On the weekend of 19 August 2005, at the 2005 Otakon anime convention, ADV Films announced a North American DVD release of Ghost Stories for the following October. The original Japanese audio and literal subtitle translation are also included. Volume 1 was released on 22 October 2005.

On 28 August 2013, Discotek Media announced that they acquired the series' license and would release it in 2014 with the ADV dub and the Japanese audio with English subtitles. The complete series was released on a three-disc set on 25 March 2014. Ghost Stories was also released on the anime streaming platform RetroCrush in February 2021.

Reception
Dhruv Sharma of Screen Rant praised the characters of Ghost Stories and their developments as "well-written", though he wrote that the animation style was "a bit dated". /Films Hoai-Tran Bui called the dubbed version of Ghost Stories the "best and worst anime dub", describing it as "raunchy, wildly inappropriate, [and] self-aware".

Music
 Opening theme "Grow Up"
 Music and lyrics: Takuya
 Arrangement: Sakuma Masahide, Hysteric Blue
 Artist: Hysteric Blue
 Ending theme "Sexy Sexy"
 Lyrics: MASASHI, TAMA
 Composer: MASASHI
 Arrangement: CASCADE, Cozy Kubo
 Artist: CASCADE

See also
 School Ghost Stories, the film from which the series was adapted
 List of ghost films

References

External links

 
 

Gakkō no Kaidan
2000 anime television series debuts
ADV Films
Aniplex
Dark comedy anime and manga
Discotek Media
Fiction about urban legends
Fuji TV original programming
Horror anime and manga
Pierrot (company)
Supernatural anime and manga